Hans-Peter Lott (born 9 March 1969) is a German athlete. He competed in the men's long jump at the 1996 Summer Olympics.

References

External links
 

1969 births
Living people
Athletes (track and field) at the 1996 Summer Olympics
German male long jumpers
Olympic athletes of Germany
Place of birth missing (living people)